KZHO-LD, virtual channel 38 (VHF digital channel 3), is a low-powered television station serving Houston, Texas, United States that is licensed to Lake Jackson. The station is owned by the Hispanic Christian Community Network.

History
The station began in 2004 on channel 45 in Victoria with the call sign K45IN. The transmitter was moved to Palacios, Texas in 2007.

The call sign was changed to KZHO-LP on August 28, 2008, and had its city of license changed to Bay City, Texas.

It was displaced to channel 40 in March 2009 due to interference from Univision affiliate KXLN (channel 45) in Houston. On April 7, 2009, the station was taken off the air pending digital conversion. The call sign was slightly changed to KZHO-LD on September 3, 2009.

Citing interference from Fox affiliate KBTV (channel 4) in Beaumont-Port Arthur, the station was displaced to channel 39 in March 2010.

In August 2010, the FCC approved the move of the station's transmitter to the Chase Tower in downtown Houston. The station signed back on the air on September 23, 2010.

Under the Advanced Television Systems Committee (ATSC) standard governing the Program and System Information Protocol, KZHO displays channel 38 to tuners because CW affiliate KIAH, transmitting on channel 38, displays channel 39 via PSIP.

Digital channels
The station's digital signal is multiplexed:

References

External links

ZHO-LD
Low-power television stations in the United States